Age Jodi Jantam Tui Hobi Por is a Bangladeshi romantic action film directed by Montazur Rahman Akbar and produced and distributed by Star Plus. It features actors Anik Rahman Obhi, Pushpita Popy, Ariyan Shah in lead roles. It was released at 29 August 2014 in Bangladesh.

Plot 
The film is mainly based on the rural background. This movie contains a triangular romance between a young woman and two young men.

Cast 
 Anik Rahman Obhi as Nayan
Pushpita Popy  as Sokhi
 Ariyan Shah as Manik
 Kotha as Doli
 Mojammel Hoque as Police OC 
 Boby as Munshi
 Tonu Pandey as Arman 
 Rex Jafor as Biddut
 Shahin as Compounder
 Badol as jhontu
 Prabir Mitro as Sokhi's Father 
 Miju Ahmed as Joardar
 Borda Mithu  as Talukdar 
 Kiron Puri as Montu

References

External links 
 
 Age Jodi Jantam Tui Hobi Por at Bangla Movie Database

Bengali-language Bangladeshi films
2010s Bengali-language films
Films directed by Montazur Rahman Akbar